Henry Chambers may refer to:

 Henry H. Chambers (1790–1826), U.S. senator from Alabama
 Henry Cousins Chambers (1823–1871), Confederate politician during the American Civil War
 Henry Chambers (Indian Army officer) (1897–1967), British Indian Army officer
 Henry Chambers (rugby union) (1865–1934), Scotland international rugby union player
 Harry Chambers (1896–1949), footballer